The Neopilionidae are a family of harvestmen.

It has a clearly Gondwanan distribution, with species found in Australia, South Africa and South America, and probably represent relicts of that time.

The family members range in size from the small Americovibone lancafrancoae (0.9 mm) to over 4 mm in the Enantiobuninae.

Some species of Enantiobuninae have blue pigmentation, which is rather unusual in harvestmen.

Name
The family name is a contraction of Ancient Greek neo "new" and Latin Opilio, a genus of harvestman.

Subdivisions
According to the Catalogue of Life, Neopilionidae includes three subfamilies, which contain a total of 19 genera and 78 species.

 Ballarrinae Hunt & Cokendolpher, 1991
 Americovibone Hunt & Cokendolpher, 1991
 Arrallaba Hunt & Cokendolpher, 1991
 Ballarra Hunt & Cokendolpher, 1991
 Plesioballarra Hunt & Cokendolpher, 1991
 Vibone Kauri, 1961

 Enantiobuninae Mello-Leitão, 1931
 Acihasta Forster, 1948 
 Australiscutum Taylor, 2009
 Forsteropsalis Taylor, 2011
 Mangatangi Taylor, 2013
 Megalopsalis Roewer, 1923
 Monoscutum Forster, 1948
 Neopantopsalis Taylor & Hunt, 2009
 Pantopsalis Simon, 1879
 Spinicrus Forster, 1949
 Templar Taylor, 2008
 Tercentenarium Taylor, 2011
 Thrasychiroides Soares & Soares, 1947
 Thrasychirus Simon, 1884

 Neopilioninae Lawrence, 1931
 Neopilio Lawrence, 1931

Footnotes

References
 Joel Hallan's Biology Catalog: Neopilionidae
  (eds.) (2007): Harvestmen - The Biology of Opiliones. Harvard University Press 

Harvestmen
Harvestman families